Madelein Meppelink (born 29 November 1989 in Rhenen) is a Dutch beach volleyball player.

Professional career
From 2007 to 2009 she played with Margo Wiltens.  From 2009 to 2011 she played with Marloes Wesselink.  From 2011 to 2013 she played with Sophie van Gestel.  The pair participated in the 2012 Summer Olympics tournament and lost in the round of 16 to Brazilians Juliana Felisberta and Larissa França, who eventually won the bronze medal.  From 2013, she teamed up with Marleen van Iersel. They participated in the 2016 Summer Olympics in Rio. They made it to the Round of 16, and lost to the Swiss team of Heidrich and Zumkehr in 3 sets (21–19, 13–21, 10–15).  From 2016 to 2017, she mostly teamed with van Gestel again, before switching to team with Sanne Keizer.

References

External links

 
 
 
 
 

1989 births
Living people
Dutch women's beach volleyball players
Beach volleyball players at the 2012 Summer Olympics
Beach volleyball players at the 2016 Summer Olympics
Olympic beach volleyball players of the Netherlands
People from Rhenen
Beach volleyball players at the 2020 Summer Olympics
Sportspeople from Utrecht (province)